Franklin Street is a main street in the centre of Adelaide, South Australia.

Extent
Franklin Street terminates at its western end at West Terrace. The eastern end merges into the northern edge of Victoria Square and continues across King William Street as Flinders Street.

History

The street was named on 23 May 1837 in honour of John Franklin, Arctic explorer and Governor of Tasmania.

Rev. James Maughan founded the  Methodist New Connection in Flinders Street, which as of 1922 was the Central Mission. The Maughan Uniting Church, built in 1965, was demolished in 2016.

2011 redevelopment
In 2011, the street commenced a mid-scale redevelopment of four major buildings:
 50m 71-83 Franklin Street [Approved-2014]
 67m 42-56 Franklin Street [Approved-2013]
 72m City Central 8 [U/C- 2012]
 73m 58-76 Franklin Street [U/C-2014]

Tesla superchargers

Notable buildings
Franklin Street is the location of the Adelaide General Post Office,  Eynesbury Senior College, the Adelaide Central bus station, and various companies.

Gallery

See also

References

Streets in Adelaide